Vasyl Stankovych (born 25 April 1946) is a retired Ukrainian fencer. He competed at the 1968, 1972 and 1976 Olympics and won team silver medals in the foil in 1968 and 1972; in 1976 he placed fourth both individually and with the Soviet team. At the world championships Stankovych won five gold medals in the foil between 1969 and 1974.

References

External links
 

1946 births
Living people
Ukrainian male foil fencers
Soviet male foil fencers
Olympic fencers of the Soviet Union
Fencers at the 1968 Summer Olympics
Fencers at the 1972 Summer Olympics
Fencers at the 1976 Summer Olympics
Olympic silver medalists for the Soviet Union
Olympic medalists in fencing
Medalists at the 1968 Summer Olympics
Medalists at the 1972 Summer Olympics
Universiade medalists in fencing
Universiade silver medalists for the Soviet Union
Medalists at the 1970 Summer Universiade
Medalists at the 1973 Summer Universiade
Sportspeople from Zakarpattia Oblast